Happily Married is a Canadian crime comedy-drama series, which premiered on Ici TOU.TV in 2020.

Plot
Set in Quebec City in the 1970s, the series centres on the Delisles and the Paquettes, two married couples in suburban Sainte-Foy who deal with problems in their marriages by embarking on a crime spree while their children are away at summer camp.

Production
The series stars François Létourneau and Marilyn Castonguay as Gaétan and Huguette Delisle, and Patrice Robitaille and Karine Gonthier-Hyndman as Serge and Micheline Paquette. Supporting cast members include Sophie Desmarais, Rémi-Pierre Paquin, Jean-François Provençal, René Richard Cyr, Patrick Drolet, Chantal Fontaine, Mani Soleymanlou, Mathieu Gosselin, Steve Laplante and Jocelyne Zucco.

Distribution
The series received a preview screening at the 70th Berlin International Film Festival, and streamed on Ici TOU.TV in March 2020, and was broadcast by Ici Radio-Canada Télé in the fall. A subtitled version was distributed on CBC Gem for English-language viewers under the Happily Married title, and the series was picked up for distribution in France on the streaming service Salto, as one of its first international acquisitions.

A second season was announced in early 2021. The first season was directed by Jean-François Rivard, who will co-direct the second season with Robin Aubert.

Awards
The series won 10 Prix Gémeaux in 2020, including the award for Best Dramatic Series.

In 2021 the show won the Rogers Prize for Excellence in Canadian Content at the Banff World Media Festival.

References

External links

2020 Canadian television series debuts
2020s Canadian crime television series
2020s Canadian comedy-drama television series
Ici Radio-Canada Télé original programming
Television shows filmed in Quebec City
Television shows set in Quebec City
Television series set in the 1970s
Television series about marriage